Vũng Liêm is a township and capital of Vũng Liêm District, Vĩnh Long Province, Vietnam.

References

Populated places in Vĩnh Long province
District capitals in Vietnam
Townships in Vietnam